Rondell "Fineman" Rawlins (c. 1975 – August 28, 2008) was a Guyanese gang leader and fugitive believed responsible for a number of crimes in the South American nation. Rawlins was implicated in the murder of Guyanese Agriculture Minister Satyadeow Sawh on April 22, 2006, along with Sawh's brother and a security guard. On January 26, 2008, Rawlins and his men killed eleven people, including five children, in an attack on the village of Lusignan in what is known as the Lusignan Massacre. On February 17, the gang carried out the Bartica Massacre, when they  attacked the town of Bartica, Essequibo, and killed 12 people including three police officers.

Rawlins believed that his missing girlfriend had been abducted by the government, thus motivating the massacres.

The Guyanese government put a reward of 50 million Guyanese dollars (US$250,000) on Rawlins and launched a nationwide manhunt. The search for Rawlins came to an end on August 28, 2008, when police found Rawlins at one of his hideouts near the capital city of Georgetown. Police shot and killed Rawlins and two other gang members in the shootout that followed.

References

External links
 The gunmen's great escape from Bartica
 Guyana shooting rampage kills 11 
 Guyanese police renew reward offer for gang wanted in slaying of agriculture minister
 Fineman Dead

1970s births
2008 deaths
Deaths by firearm in Guyana
People shot dead by law enforcement officers
Guyanese criminals
Gang members